The 1905 season in Swedish football, starting January 1905 and ending December 1905:

Honours

Official titles

Competitions

Promotions, relegations and qualifications

Promotions

Relegations

Domestic results

Svenska Bollspelsförbundets tävlingsserie klass 1 1905

Svenska Bollspelsförbundets tävlingsserie klass 2 1905

Göteborgsserien klass I 1905

Göteborgsserien klass II 1905

Svenska Mästerskapet 1905 
Final

Kamratmästerskapen 1905 
Final

Wicanderska Välgörenhetsskölden 1905 
Final

Notes

References 
Print

Online

 
Seasons in Swedish football